Thomas Bedford may refer to:

 Thomas Bedford (theologian) ( 1650), English controversialist
 Thomas Bedford (historian) (died 1773), nonjuror and church historian
 Thomas Bedford (MP), MP for Bedford
 Thomas Bedford, physicist and namesake of Bedford Island
 Thomas Bedford, American Revolutionary War officer, namesake of Bedford County, Tennessee
 Tommy Bedford (born 1942), South African rugby player

See also

Bedford (surname)